Abdel-Qader Saïd (born 11 June 1989), also known as Abdel Saïd, is an Egyptian equestrian. He made his debut appearance at the Olympics representing Egypt at the 2020 Summer Olympics. He competed in the individual jumping.

References

External links

 
 
 
 

1989 births
Living people
Egyptian male equestrians
Equestrians at the 2020 Summer Olympics
Olympic equestrians of Egypt
Sportspeople from Alexandria
Show jumping riders